Abarema filamentosa is a species of plant in the family Fabaceae. It is endemic to the Brazilian states of Bahia and Espírito Santo, and is found in lowland wet Atlantic Forest and restinga.

References

filamentosa
Endemic flora of Brazil
Vulnerable plants
Taxonomy articles created by Polbot